Tyler Baldock (born September 21, 1984) is a Canadian former soccer player who played as an goalkeeper.

College career
Baldock attended Carson–Newman University, where he played for the men's soccer team from 2003 to 2007. With the Eagles, he won four consecutive regular season SAC titles, a tournament title and a regional title. He was a three time All-American, All-Region and All-Conference award winner and earned back-to-back South Atlantic Conference Player of the Year honours in 2004 and 2005. He is the Carson-Newman and SAC record-holder for career shutouts with 36, and also holds the school records for career goals against average (0.75) and wins (51). He was inducted into the school's hall of fame in 2021.

Club career
In 2005, he played for the West Virginia Chaos in the Premier Development League.

In 2007, he played for the Vancouver Whitecaps in the USL First Division.

In 2008, he played for the Abbotsford Mariners in the Premier Development League.

In 2008, he returned to the Whitecaps. After not appearing in a league match with the Whitecaps, he made his debut in the playoff semi-finals against the Montreal Impact after starting goalkeeper Jay Nolly was red-carded in the first leg. He kept a clean sheet in the second leg of the series, helping the Whitecaps to advance to the finals, where they defeated the Puerto Rico Islanders to win the league championship, but Baldock did not play in the final.

Coaching career
In 2008, he became the goalkeepers coach for Trinity Western University.

He then worked with the Vancouver Whitecaps FC Academy.

Since 2015, he has been the goalkeeper coach for Simon Fraser University's men's soccer team. He also serves as goalkeeper coach for the youth club Surrey United SC.

In 2020, he was named goalkeepers coach for the Canadian women's U20 team ahead of the 2020 CONCACAF Women's U-20 Championship.

Career statistics

References

1984 births
Living people
Association football goalkeepers
Canadian soccer players
Soccer people from British Columbia
Carson–Newman University alumni
Fraser Valley Mariners players
Vancouver Whitecaps (1986–2010) players
Simon Fraser Clan men's soccer coaches
Vancouver Whitecaps FC non-playing staff